Šarac may refer to:

 Šarac (surname), Serbian, Montenegrin, Bosnian and Croatian surname
 , Prince Marko's horse
 Šarac (dog) (Šarplaninac), dog breed

See also 

 Šarec (disambiguation)